Alastor atropos is a species of wasp in the family Vespidae.

References

atropos
Insects described in 1841